Stenorynchoacrum xijiangensis is a species of cyprinid fish endemic to China where it is only known from Guangxi Province.  It occurs in a tributary of the Zhujiang River.  This species is the only known member of its genus.

References

Labeoninae
Cyprinid fish of Asia
Endemic fauna of Guangxi
Freshwater fish of China
Fish described in 2014